Elsevier Weekblad, abbreviated to EW, still known as Elsevier, is a Dutch weekly news magazine. With a circulation of over 68,000 copies as of 2018, it is the Netherlands' most popular news magazine.

Elsevier Weekblad focuses mainly on politics, international affairs and business. In terms of scope of articles it is most comparable to Germany's Focus, Belgium's Knack or America's Time. Like Time, Elsevier Weekblad runs a yearly cover story about a Person of the Year. The magazine is, together with de Volkskrant and NRC Handelsblad, conventionally considered to be one of the most influential written media in the Dutch language. Views expressed are generally conservative right wing.

History and profile
The predecessor of the magazine, Elsevier's Geïllustreerd Maandschrift (Elsevier's Illustrated Monthly), was first issued in January 1891 and was modelled after Harper's Magazine. It was published by J.G. Robbers and his Elsevier company, which had been founded in 1880 and took its name from the famous (but unrelated) Elzevir family of the 16th to 18th centuries. In 1940, the magazine was prohibited by the German authorities, who occupied the Netherlands at the time, and the last issue of the magazine was issued in December that year.

Henk Lunshof, a journalist of De Telegraaf, had thought of establishing a new news magazine since 1940. He was approached by Jan Pieter Klautz, director of the publishing company Elsevier, and the two secretly started preparing the establishment of the magazine. They were assisted by G.B.J. Hiltermann, another former journalist of De Telegraaf. The magazine was finally introduced as Elseviers Weekblad ("Elsevier's Weekly") on 27 October 1945, and Lunshof became its editor. Its aim was to take an independent position, not linked to any political party or association. By the end of the 1940s, however, EW adopted a clear position against the independence of Indonesia, after which it developed a socially conservative and economically liberal signature, closely linked to the liberals of the VVD and the Catholics of the KVP.

The magazine was an instant success and very profitable. The expansion of Elsevier in the scientific field after 1945 was funded with the profits of the newsweekly.

Communists would later become enemies with Elsevier Weekblad. This and the increasingly old-fashioned image of the magazine sparked the demand for a new leadership and a new formula. The new editor in chief, André Spoor, formerly editor in chief of NRC Handelsblad, renewed the redaction, changed the layout and shortened the name to Elsevier. In the following years, the magazine lost its literary character and started focusing on journalism. It claims that while opinion pieces remained, it became less ideological and more factual.

The magazine has several supplements, one of which is Elsevier Weekblad Juist, a monthly lifestyle and business magazine.

Reed Business Information sold a majority stake in Elsevier to New Skool Media in 2016; the two companies created the joint venture ONE Business.

Circulation
In 2001 Elsevier Weekblad had a circulation of 129,000 copies. In 2010 the circulation of the magazine was 135,838 copies. It was 62,458 copies in 2018.

References

External links
  

1945 establishments in the Netherlands
Dutch-language magazines
Elsevier
Magazines established in 1945
Magazines published in Amsterdam
News magazines published in Europe
Political magazines published in the Netherlands
Weekly magazines published in the Netherlands